Elections to Carrickfergus Borough Council were held on 5 May 2005 on the same day as the other Northern Irish local government elections. The election used three district electoral areas to elect a total of 17 councillors.

Election results

Note: "Votes" are the first preference votes.

Districts summary

|- class="unsortable" align="centre"
!rowspan=2 align="left"|Ward
! % 
!Cllrs
! % 
!Cllrs
! %
!Cllrs
! %
!Cllrs
!rowspan=2|TotalCllrs
|- class="unsortable" align="center"
!colspan=2 bgcolor="" | DUP
!colspan=2 bgcolor="" | UUP
!colspan=2 bgcolor="" | Alliance
!colspan=2 bgcolor="white"| Others
|-
|align="left"|Carrick Castle
|bgcolor="#D46A4C"|41.1
|bgcolor="#D46A4C"|2
|9.1
|1
|26.3
|1
|23.5
|1
|5
|-
|align="left"|Kilroot
|bgcolor="#D46A4C"|42.0
|bgcolor="#D46A4C"|3
|14.1
|1
|23.5
|1
|20.4
|1
|6
|-
|align="left"|Knockagh Monument
|bgcolor="#D46A4C"|45.9
|bgcolor="#D46A4C"|3
|27.5
|2
|20.9
|1
|5.7
|0
|6
|-
|- class="unsortable" class="sortbottom" style="background:#C9C9C9"
|align="left"| Total
|43.3
|8
|18.0
|4
|23.2
|3
|15.5
|2
|17
|-
|}

Districts results

Carrick Castle

2001: 2 x DUP, 1 x Alliance, 1 x UUP, 1 x Independent
2005: 2 x DUP, 1 x Alliance, 1 x UUP, 1 x Independent
2001-2005 Change: No change

Kilroot

2001: 2 x DUP, 2 x Alliance, 1 x UUP, 1 x Independent
2005: 3 x DUP, 1 x Alliance, 1 x UUP, 1 x Independent
2001-2005 Change: DUP gain from Alliance

Knockagh Monument

2001: 2 x DUP, 2 x UUP, 2 x Alliance
2005: 3 x DUP, 2 x UUP, 1 x Alliance
2001-2005 Change: DUP gain from Alliance

References

Carrickfergus Borough Council elections
Carrickfergus